The 2nd Kansas Militia Regiment was a formation of Kansas State Militia during the American Civil War commanded by Colonel George W. Veale.

History 
The 2nd Regiment of Kansas State Militia was organized in Shawnee County, Kansas, on October 12, 1864, to defend the state against Price's Missouri Raid. The regiment consisted of 561 men, many mounted on their own farm horses.  It rode into Missouri on October 21 in anticipation of Price's arrival where they met with other federal troops and militias from Kansas and Missouri to join with the Army of the Border. On October 22, the Confederates arrived at the edge of Mockbee Farm where federal forces were waiting. The Confederates scattered the militia, many of whom retreated towards Westport (present-day Kansas City). This would lead to the Battle of Westport, where Price's military efforts would largely collapse. Several men were captured by Confederate forces after the battle at Mockbee Farm and marched south.  The regiment was disbanded on October 29, 1864.

Notable members
 Samuel J. Reader
 Floyd Perry Baker

See also
 List of Kansas Civil War units

References

Further reading 
 Dyer, Frederick H. (1959). A Compendium of the War of the Rebellion. New York and London. Thomas Yoseloff, Publisher. .

1864 establishments in Kansas
1864 disestablishments in Kansas
Units and formations of the Union Army from Kansas
Military units and formations established in 1864
Military units and formations disestablished in 1864
Militia in the United States
Regiments of the United States
Shawnee County, Kansas